The Roman Rite is the most common ritual family for performing the ecclesiastical services of the Latin Church, the largest of the sui iuris particular churches that comprise the Catholic Church. The Roman Rite governs rites such as the Roman Mass and the Liturgy of the Hours as well as the manner in which sacraments and blessings are performed.

The Roman Rite developed in the Latin language in the city of Rome and, while distinct Latin liturgical rites such as the Ambrosian Rite remain, the Roman Rite has gradually been adopted almost everywhere in the Latin Church. In medieval times there were numerous local variants, even if all of them did not amount to distinct rites, yet uniformity increased as a result of the invention of printing and in obedience to the decrees of the Council of Trent of 1545–63 (see Quo primum). Several Latin liturgical rites that survived into the 20th century were abandoned after the Second Vatican Council. The Roman Rite is now the most widespread liturgical rite not only in the Catholic Church but in Christianity as a whole.

The Roman Rite has been adapted through the centuries and the history of its Eucharistic liturgy can be divided into three stages: the Pre-Tridentine Mass, Tridentine Mass, and Mass of Paul VI. It is now normally celebrated in the form promulgated by Pope Paul VI in 1969 and revised by Pope John Paul II in 2002, but use of the Roman Missal of 1962 remains authorized under the conditions indicated in the 2021 papal document Traditionis Custodes.

Comparison with Eastern rites
The Roman Rite is noted for its sobriety of expression. In its Tridentine form, it was noted also for its formality: the Tridentine Missal minutely prescribed every movement, to the extent of laying down that the priest should put his right arm into the right sleeve of the alb before putting his left arm into the left sleeve (Ritus servandus in celebratione Missae, I, 3). Concentration on the exact moment of change of the bread and wine into the Body and Blood of Christ has led, in the Roman Rite, to the consecrated Host and the chalice being shown to the people immediately after the Words of Institution. If, as was once most common, the priest offers Mass while facing ad apsidem (towards the apse), ad orientem (towards the east) if the apse is at the east end of the church, he shows them to the people, who are behind him, by elevating them above his head. As each is shown, a bell (once called "the sacring bell") is rung and, if incense is used, the host and chalice are incensed (General Instruction of the Roman Missal, 100). Sometimes the external bells of the church are rung as well. Other characteristics that distinguish the Roman Rite from the rites of the Eastern Catholic Churches are genuflections and keeping both hands joined together.

Antiquity of the Roman Mass
In his 1912 book on the Roman Mass, Adrian Fortescue wrote: "Essentially the Missal of Pius V is the Gregorian Sacramentary; that again is formed from the Gelasian book, which depends on the Leonine collection. We find the prayers of our Canon in the treatise de Sacramentis and allusions to it in the 4th century. So our Mass goes back, without essential change, to the age when it first developed out of the oldest liturgy of all. It is still redolent of that liturgy, of the days when Caesar ruled the world and thought he could stamp out the faith of Christ, when our fathers met together before dawn and sang a hymn to Christ as to a God. The final result of our inquiry is that, in spite of unsolved problems, in spite of later changes, there is not in Christendom another rite so venerable as ours." In a footnote he added: "The prejudice that imagines that everything Eastern must be old is a mistake. Eastern rites have been modified later too; some of them quite late. No Eastern Rite now used is as archaic as the Roman Mass."

In the same book, Fortescue acknowledged that the Roman Rite underwent profound changes in the course of its development. His ideas are summarized in the article on the "Liturgy of the Mass" that he wrote for the Catholic Encyclopedia (published between 1907 and 1914) in which he pointed out that the earliest form of the Roman Mass, as witnessed in Justin Martyr's 2nd-century account, is of Eastern type, while the Leonine and Gelasian Sacramentaries, of about the 6th century, "show us what is practically our present Roman Mass". In the interval, there was what Fortescue called "a radical change". He quoted the theory of A. Baumstark that the Hanc Igitur, Quam oblationem, Supra quæ and Supplices, and the list of saints in the Nobis quoque were added to the Roman Canon of the Mass under "a mixed influence of Antioch and Alexandria", and that "St. Leo I began to make these changes; Gregory I finished the process and finally recast the Canon in the form it still has."

Fortescue concluded:
 We have then as the conclusion of this paragraph that at Rome the Eucharistic prayer was fundamentally changed and recast at some uncertain period between the fourth and the sixth and seventh centuries. During the same time the prayers of the faithful before the Offertory disappeared, the kiss of peace was transferred to after the Consecration, and the Epiklesis was omitted or mutilated into our "Supplices" prayer. Of the various theories suggested to account for this it seems reasonable to say with Rauschen: "Although the question is by no means decided, nevertheless there is so much in favour of Drews's theory that for the present it must be considered the right one. We must then admit that between the years 400 and 500 a great transformation was made in the Roman Canon" (Euch. u. Busssakr., 86).

In the same article Fortescue went on to speak of the many alterations that the Roman Rite of Mass underwent from the 7th century on (see Pre-Tridentine Mass), in particular through the infusion of Gallican elements, noticeable chiefly in the variations for the course of the year. This infusion Fortescue called the "last change since Gregory the Great" (who died in 604).

The Eucharistic Prayer normally used in the Byzantine Rite is attributed to Saint John Chrysostom, who died in 404, exactly two centuries before Pope Gregory the Great. The East Syrian Eucharistic Prayer of Addai and Mari, which is still in use, is certainly much older.

Liturgy and traditions

Roman Missal

The Roman Missal is the liturgical book that contains the texts and rubrics for the celebration of the Mass in the Roman Rite of the Catholic Church.

Before the high Middle Ages, several books were used at Mass: a Sacramentary with the prayers, one or more books for the Scriptural readings, and one or more books for the antiphons and other chants. Gradually, manuscripts came into being that incorporated parts of more than one of these books, leading finally to versions that were complete in themselves. Such a book was referred to as a Missale Plenum. In response to reforms called for in the Council of Trent, Pope Pius V promulgated, in the Apostolic Constitution Quo primum of 14 July 1570, an edition of the Roman Missal that was to be in obligatory use throughout the Roman Catholic Church except where there was a traditional liturgical rite that could be proved to be of at least two centuries’ antiquity.  The version of the Mass in the 1570s edition became known as the Tridentine Mass. Various relatively minor revision were made in the centuries following, culminating in the 1962 edition promulgated by Pope John XXIII.  Pope John XXIII opened the Second Vatican Council that same year, whose participating bishops ultimately called for renewal and reform of the liturgy.  The 1969 edition of the Roman Missal was promulgated by Pope Paul VI, issued in response to the council, introduced several major revisions, including simplifying the rituals and permitting translations into local vernacular languages.  The version of the Mass in this missal, known colloquially as the Mass of Paul VI, is currently in use throughout the world.

Arrangement of churches
The Roman Rite of Mass no longer has the pulpitum, or rood screen, a dividing wall characteristic of certain medieval cathedrals in northern Europe, or the iconostasis or curtain that heavily influences the ritual of some other rites. In large churches of the Middle Ages and early Renaissance the area near the main altar, reserved for the clergy, was separated from the nave (the area for the laity) by means of a rood screen extending from the floor to the beam that supported the great cross (the rood) of the church and sometimes topped by a loft or singing gallery. However, by about 1800 the Roman Rite had quite abandoned rood screens, although some fine examples survive.

Chant
Gregorian chant is the traditional chant of the Roman Rite. Being entirely monophonic, it does not have the dense harmonies of present-day chanting in the Russian and Georgian churches. Except in such pieces as the graduals and alleluias, it does not have melismata as lengthy as those of Coptic Christianity. However, the music of the Roman Rite became very elaborate and lengthy when Western Europe adopted polyphony. While the choir sang one part of the Mass the priest said that part quietly to himself and continued with other parts, or he was directed by the rubrics to sit and wait for the conclusion of the choir's singing. Therefore, it became normal in the Tridentine Mass for the priest to say Mass, not sing it, in contrast to the practice in all Eastern rites. Only on special occasions and in the principal Mass in monasteries and cathedrals was the Mass sung.

Roman Rite of Mass

See also
 List of Catholic rites and churches
 Liturgical books of the Roman rite
 Ordines Romani

References

Further reading
 Baldovin, SJ., John F. (2008). Reforming the Liturgy: A Response to the Critics. The Liturgical Press.
 Bugnini, Annibale (1990). The Reform of the Liturgy 1948–1975. The Liturgical Press.
 Davies, Michael A Short History of the Roman Mass, said to be based on Adrian Fortescue's The Mass: A Study of the Roman Liturgy
 Foley, Edward; Mitchell, Nathan D.; and Pierce, Joanne M. A Commentary on the General Instruction of the Roman Missal. The Liturgical Press.
 Johnson, Lawrence, J. (2009). Worship in the Early Church: An Anthology of Historical Sources. The Liturgical Press.
 Marini, Piero (Archbishop) (2007). A Challenging Reform: Realizing the Vision of the Liturgical Renewal. The Liturgical Press.
 
 Morrill, Bruce T., SJ, contributing editor. Bodies of Worship: Explorations in Theory and Practice. The Liturgical Press.

External links
 Liturgy of the Mass (Catholic Encyclopedia)
 The Roman Rite (Catholic Encyclopedia)
Australian site, mainly on present form of the Roman Rite

 
Western Christianity